Hippotion hateleyi is a moth of the  family Sphingidae. It is known from Henderson Island.

References

Hippotion
Moths described in 1990